Eoophyla guillermetorum is a moth in the family Crambidae. It was described by Viette in 1988. It is found on La Réunion.

References

Eoophyla
Moths described in 1988